The 10th season of Taniec z Gwiazdami, the Polish edition of Dancing With the Stars, started on 6 September 2009 and ended on 29 November 2009. It was broadcast by TVN. Katarzyna Skrzynecka and Piotr Gąsowski continued as the hosts, and the judges were: Iwona Szymańska-Pavlović, Zbigniew Wodecki, Beata Tyszkiewicz and Piotr Galiński.

Couples

Scores

Red numbers indicate the lowest score for each week.
Green numbers indicate the highest score for each week.
 indicates the couple eliminated that week.
 indicates the returning couple that finished in the bottom two.
 indicates the winning couple of the week.
 indicates the runner-up of the week.
 indicates the third place couple of the week.

Notes:

Week 1: Natasza Urbańska scored 38 out of 40 on her first dance (Cha Cha Cha). It was the highest score ever in Week 1. Iga Wyrwał got the lowest score in history of the show, scoring 17 out of 40 for her Cha Cha Cha. There was no elimination this week.

Week 2: There was a three-way tie on the first place, with Anna Mucha, Michał Kwiatkowski and Zygmunt Chajzer all getting 37 out of 40.  Michał Kwiatkowski made the biggest weekly improvement in history of the show, after scoring 18 points in Week 1 and then 37 points in Week 2. Steve Allen also made the biggest weekly improvement in history of the show, after scoring 18 points in Week 3 and then 37 points in Week 4 Season 8. Iga Wyrwał got 19 points for her Quickstep, making it the lowest score of the week. Marek & Agnieszka were eliminated despite being 4 points from the bottom.

Week 3: Anna Mucha and Natasza Urbańska received the first perfect score of the season as well as the earliest perfect score in history of the show. Only Mateusz Damięcki, Agata Kulesza, Alan Andersz and Dorota Gardias-Skóra have scored 40 points in Week 3. Iga Wyrwał got the lowest score in history of the show, scoring 15 out of 40 for her Jive. Iga & Łukasz were on the bottom of the leaderboard for the third consecutive week. Iga & Łukasz were eliminated.

Week 4: Anna Mucha received her second perfect score for the Foxtrot. Otylia Jędrzejczak got 23 points for her Paso Doble, making it the lowest score of the week. Weronika & Krzysztof were eliminated despite being 4 points from the bottom.

Week 5: Natasza Urbańska received her second perfect score for the Samba. Piotr Zelt got 24 points for his Samba, making it the lowest score of the week. Piotr & Anna were eliminated.

Week 6: Zygmunt Chajzer got his first perfect scores for the Salsa. There was a two-way tie on the second place, with Anna Mucha and Natasza Urbańska all getting 39 out of 40. Marcin Urbaś got 27 points for his Salsa, making it the lowest score of the week. Grażyna & Cezary were eliminated despite being 6 points from the bottom.

Week 7: All couples danced to the most famous songs of Michael Jackson. Natasza Urbańska received her 3rd perfect score for the Paso Doble. Anna Mucha got 26 points for her Jive, making it the lowest score of the week and her the lowest score ever. Marcin & Katarzyna were eliminated.

Week 8: All couples danced to songs from famous movies. Anna Mucha received her third perfect score for the Viennese Waltz. Otylia Jędrzejczak got 28 points for her Foxtrot, making it the lowest score of the week. Zygmunt & Blanka were eliminated despite being 8 points from the bottom.

Week 9: Anna Mucha got two perfect scores for her Cha-cha-cha and Waltz, having scored 3 perfect scores in a row. Otylia Jędrzejczak got 26 points for her Jive and 35 points for her Tango, making it the lowest score of the week. Otylia & Sławomir were eliminated.

Week 10: Natasza Urbańska got two perfect scores for her Cha-cha-cha and Argentine Tango. Also Anna Mucha got two perfect scores for her Paso Doble and Foxtrot, having scored 5 perfect scores in a row. Radosław Majdan got 32 points for his Quickstep and 38 points for his Paso Doble, making it the lowest score of the week. Radosław & Izabela were eliminated.

Week 11: Michał Kwiatkowski got his first perfect scores for the Salsa and Foxtrot. Natasza Urbańska got two perfect scores for her Salsa and Viennese Waltz. Anna Mucha receiver her 8th perfect score for the Tango, having scored 6 perfect scores in a row. Anna Mucha also was in the bottom two for the first time in the competition. Michał & Janja were eliminated.

Week 12:  Both Anna Mucha and Natasza Urbańska got 120 out of 120 points, making it the second season finale in a row with both couples getting the highest possible score. Both couples had to perform three dances: their favorite Latin dance, their favorite Ballroom dance and a Freestyle. Anna Mucha received her 9th, 10th and 11th perfect score for the Rumba, Quickstep in American Smooth and Freestyle. Natasza Urbańska also received her 9th, 10th and 11th perfect score for the Samba, Argentine Tango and Freestyle. Anna Mucha and Natasza Urbańska received eleven perfect score. This is the record of the show. Anna Mucha won the competition, having cast 50.01 percent of the votes. This is the fourth time the winner was not on the first place according to the judges' scoreboard.

Special Star

Average chart

Average dance chart

Highest and lowest scoring performances
The best and worst performances in each dance according to the judges' marks are as follows:

Episodes

Week 1
Individual judges scores in charts below (given in parentheses) are listed in this order from left to right: Iwona Szymańska-Pavlović, Zbigniew Wodecki, Beata Tyszkiewicz and Piotr Galiński.

Running order

Week 2
Individual judges scores in charts below (given in parentheses) are listed in this order from left to right: Iwona Szymańska-Pavlović, Zbigniew Wodecki, Beata Tyszkiewicz and Piotr Galiński.

Running order

Week 3
Individual judges scores in charts below (given in parentheses) are listed in this order from left to right: Iwona Szymańska-Pavlović, Zbigniew Wodecki, Beata Tyszkiewicz and Piotr Galiński.

Running order

Week 4
Individual judges scores in charts below (given in parentheses) are listed in this order from left to right: Iwona Szymańska-Pavlović, Zbigniew Wodecki, Beata Tyszkiewicz and Piotr Galiński.

Running order

Week 5
Individual judges scores in charts below (given in parentheses) are listed in this order from left to right: Iwona Szymańska-Pavlović, Zbigniew Wodecki, Beata Tyszkiewicz and Piotr Galiński.

Running order

Week 6
Individual judges scores in charts below (given in parentheses) are listed in this order from left to right: Iwona Szymańska-Pavlović, Zbigniew Wodecki, Beata Tyszkiewicz and Piotr Galiński.

Running order

Week 7: Michael Jackson Week
Individual judges scores in charts below (given in parentheses) are listed in this order from left to right: Iwona Szymańska-Pavlović, Zbigniew Wodecki, Beata Tyszkiewicz and Piotr Galiński.

Running order

Week 8: Movie Themes Week
Individual judges scores in charts below (given in parentheses) are listed in this order from left to right: Iwona Szymańska-Pavlović, Zbigniew Wodecki, Beata Tyszkiewicz and Piotr Galiński.

Running order

Week 9: Musical Duets Week
Individual judges scores in charts below (given in parentheses) are listed in this order from left to right: Iwona Szymańska-Pavlović, Zbigniew Wodecki, Beata Tyszkiewicz and Piotr Galiński.

Running order

Week 10
Individual judges scores in charts below (given in parentheses) are listed in this order from left to right: Iwona Szymańska-Pavlović, Zbigniew Wodecki, Beata Tyszkiewicz and Piotr Galiński.

Running order

Week 11
Individual judges scores in charts below (given in parentheses) are listed in this order from left to right: Iwona Szymańska-Pavlović, Zbigniew Wodecki, Beata Tyszkiewicz and Piotr Galiński.

Running order

Week 12: Final
Individual judges scores in charts below (given in parentheses) are listed in this order from left to right: Iwona Szymańska-Pavlović, Zbigniew Wodecki, Beata Tyszkiewicz and Piotr Galiński.

Running order

Other Dances

Dance schedule
The celebrities and professional partners danced one of these routines for each corresponding week.
 Week 1: Cha-Cha-Cha or Waltz
 Week 2: Rumba or Quickstep
 Week 3: Jive or Tango
 Week 4: Paso Doble or Foxtrot
 Week 5: Samba or Viennese Waltz
 Week 6: Salsa or an unlearned Ballroom dance in American Smooth style
 Week 7: One unlearned dance & Group Viennese Waltz (Michael Jackson Week)
 Week 8: One unlearned dance & Group Rumba (Movies Week)
 Week 9: One unlearned dance & one repeated dance (Duet Week)
 Week 10: One unlearned (or Tango Argentino) & one repeated dance
 Week 11: Salsa & one repeated Ballroom dance  Natasza & Jan: One unlearned Latin dance & One unlearned Ballroom dance
 Week 12: Favorite Latin dance, favorite Ballroom dance & Freestyle

Dance Chart

 Highest scoring dance
 Lowest scoring dance
 Performed, but not scored

Weekly results
The order is based on the judges' scores combined with the viewers' votes.

 This couple came in first place with the judges.
 This couple came in first place with the judges and gained the highest number of viewers' votes.
 This couple gained the highest number of viewers' votes.
 This couple came in last place with the judges and gained the highest number of viewers' votes.
 This couple came in last place with the judges.
 This couple came in last place with the judges and was eliminated.
 This couple was eliminated.
 This couple won the competition.
 This couple came in second in the competition.
 This couple came in third in the competition.

Audience voting results
The percentage of votes cast by a couple in a particular week is given in parentheses.

Rating Figures

External links
 Official Site – Taniec z gwiazdami
 Taniec z gwiazdami on Polish Wikipedia

References

Season 10
2009 Polish television seasons